The John C. Bell House is a historic house located at 229 S. 22nd St. in the Rittenhouse Square neighborhood of Philadelphia, Pennsylvania.  It was designed by architect Horace Trumbauer in the Colonial Revival style and built in 1906.  It was listed on the National Register of Historic Places in 1982.

The house was built for John C. Bell, who served as Attorney General of Pennsylvania.  His sons, John C. Bell, Jr., who served as Lieutenant Governor and Governor of Pennsylvania as well as Chief Justice of the Pennsylvania Supreme Court, and Bert Bell, co-founder of the Philadelphia Eagles and NFL Commissioner, lived in the house.  In 1944 the house was sold by the Bell family and converted into apartments.

A top-floor balcony collapsed on January 11, 2014, leaving one person dead and two others seriously injured.

References

Houses on the National Register of Historic Places in Philadelphia
Colonial Revival architecture in Pennsylvania
Houses completed in 1906
Rittenhouse Square, Philadelphia
Horace Trumbauer buildings
1906 establishments in Pennsylvania